The 2020 CECAFA U-20 Championship took place from 22 November to 2 December 2020 in Arusha, Tanzania.

This competition served as the CECAFA qualifiers for the 2021 Africa U-20 Cup of Nations. The two finalists of the tournament represented CECAFA in the 2021 Africa U-20 Cup of Nations. It was initially planned to be hosted by Sudan in October–November 2020 but were then later shifted and held in Tanzania between 22 November–2 December 2020.

The matches were played at Karatu (Black Rhino Academy) and Arusha (Sheikh Amri Abeid Memorial Stadium)

All the 11 teams were initially drawn into 3 groups, 2 groups of 4 teams and 1 group of 3 teams but ultimately Rwanda & Eritrea withdrew.
The winners of each group and the best runners-up advanced to the semi-finals.

All times are local, EAT (UTC+3).

Venues

Sheikh Amri Abeid Memorial Stadium, Arusha, Tanzania
Black Rhino Academy, Karatu, Tanzania

Teams

 (withdrew)
 (withdrew)

Officials 

Referees
  Nsoro Ruzindana (Rwanda)
  Saddam Houssein Mansour (Djibouti)
  Israel Mpaima (Kenya)
  Ahmed Hassan Hussein (Somalia)
  Belay Tadesse  (Ethiopia)
  Martin Saanya (Tanzania)
   (Ms) Florentina Zabron (Tanzania)
  Mohamed Elsiddig Eltreefe (Sudan)
  William Oloya (Uganda)
  Ring Nyier Akech Malong (South Sudan)

Assistant Referees
  Joshua Achila (Kenya)
  Nour Abdi Mohamed (Somalia)
  Tigle Gizaw Belachew  (Ethiopia)
  Mohamed Salim Mkono (Tanzania)
  Emmanuel Okudra (Uganda)
  George Primato Olibo (South Sudan)
  (Ms) Fides Bangurambona (Burundi)
  Desire Nkurunziza (Burundi)
  Raymond Nonati Bwiliza (Rwanda)
  Liban Abdirazack Ahmed  (Djibouti)
  Omer Hamid Ahmed (Sudan)

Group stage

Group A

Group B

Group C

Knockout stage

Semi-finals
Winners qualified for 2021 Africa U-20 Cup of Nations.

3rd Place match

Finals

Champion

Qualification for CAF U20 Cup of Nations
The two finalists of the tournament qualified for the 2021 Africa U-20 Cup of Nations. 

Qualified nations:

References 

2020 in African football